Dr Janet Folkes (20 July 1959 – 17 January 2012) was an academic from Nottingham, who held multiple ballooning records. She died in 2012 from cancer.

Career
She was in the University of Nottingham's Engineering Faculty and an expert on lasers. She researched the use of lasers in cutting, welding and shaping metals- working closely with the engine maker Rolls-Royce.

Ballooning
Folkes died in January 2012 but left as a legacy the Nottingham University balloon, G-NUNI.
She competed in the Gordon Bennett cup in 1999, 2002, 2003, 2004, 2007, 2009; this is for gas filled balloons. During the 2009 race she set the women's world endurance record with Dr Ann Rich staying in the air for over 69 hours. She also piloted hot air balloons.

She established 45 World records.

In 1995 she set the women's world altitude balloons record.

She was involved as a technical engineer on the non-stop around the world attempt by Richard Branson, Per Lindstrand and Steve Fossett.

References

1959 births
2012 deaths
English balloonists
Balloon flight record holders
Alumni of the University of Nottingham
People educated at Carlton le Willows Academy
People from Nottingham